Ṭhē is an additional letter of the Arabic script. It has the basic shape of tāʼ, but with vertical dots, rather than horizontal. It is not used in the Arabic alphabet itself, but is used to represent an aspirated  in Sindhi, a language mainly spoken in Pakistan. Its Latin description is ṭh, or sometimes t́h.

The letter is encoded in the Arabic Unicode block as Tteheh at U+067A.

References 

Arabic letters
Sindhi language